Dalbergia velutina (synonym D. pierreana) is a species of liana.  The genus Dalbergia is placed in the subfamily Faboideae and tribe Dalbergieae.

The recorded range of this species is from Assam to southern China, Indochina and Peninsula Malaysia.  In Vietnam it may be known under its synonym Dalbergia pierreana or trắc Pierre.

Varieties
Plants of the World Online currently includes:
 Dalbergia velutina var. succirubra (Gagnep. & Craib) Niyomdham
 Dalbergia velutina var. verrucosa (Craib) Niyomdham (Thailand)

References

External links

 
Flora of Indo-China